The Salt Lake City Police Department (SLCPD) is the police department of Salt Lake City, Utah.

History
The SLCPD was founded in 1851, under a then newly created City Charter, when the Mayor authorized a police department to be created and forty men were appointed, earning 25 cents-an-hour.

The SLCPD is headquartered in downtown Salt Lake City, Utah,-at 475 South and 300 East, one block east of the Salt Lake City Public Library. This headquarters is called the Salt Lake City Public Safety Building and is shared with the Salt Lake City Fire Department. 

The Chief of Police, Mike Brown, was appointed by Mayor Jackie Biskupski on May 3, 2016, and previously was the Interim Police Chief from June 11, 2015. 

The Salt Lake City Police Department is divided into two bureaus, which are directed from the Office of the Chief. They are the Administrative Bureau and the Operations Bureau and each is commanded by a Deputy Chief of Police. The bureaus, in turn, are divided into eight different divisions. Four of those are geographical, where the city is split into Central Patrol, Pioneer Patrol (west) and Liberty Patrol (east), and the Salt Lake City International Airport, whose police merged with the SLCPD on December 31, 2018. Additionally, staff are also allocated to the Special Operations, Investigations, Support and Professional Standards divisions.

The Salt Lake Police Association represents over 350 rank and file officers. The association began life as The Salt Lake City Police Mutual Aid Association, established in 1911. After a few iterations, in 1984, the Salt Lake Police Association was formed as an independent union, and won recognition by the City as the exclusive bargaining agent for the officers. Since 2014, the Association stands with the Utah State AFL-CIO in legislative issues to preserve retirement, collective bargaining and other labor issues although presently not an affiliate. The current president is Joe McBride.

High-profile cases
The SLCPD has handled several cases in recent years, most notably the Elizabeth Smart kidnapping in 2002, the murder of Lori Hacking in 2004, the kidnapping and murder of Destiny Norton in 2006, and the shooting spree at Trolley Square in 2007 that resulted in 5 deaths and 4 serious woundings. The department also took part in the Salt Lake City Public Library hostage incident in 1994. 

On August 13, 2017, officer Clinton Fox fatally shot Patrick Harmon, an African American man they attempted to arrest for riding a bicycle without proper lighting. Later that same month, footage released on August 31, 2017 show an emergency room incident between the police detective Jeff Payne and the nurse Alex Wubbels at the University of Utah Hospital. Payne asked Wubbels to provide a blood sample from an unconscious patient, and she was arrested when she refused. Payne is no longer working for the department. Wubbels was later released and no charges were brought against her. In September 2017, the Salt Lake County District Attorney's Office and Unified Police launched an independent criminal investigation into the arrest. 

In 2019, the Salt Lake Police Department garnered international attention surrounding the murder of Mackenzie Lueck, a University of Utah student.

In 2020, the Salt Lake Police Department garnered controversy when an officer shot Linden Cameron, an unarmed 13-year old boy with Asperger's syndrome.

Ranks and Insignia

See also 

 List of law enforcement agencies in Utah
 Salt Lake City Fire Department
 Salt Lake City website
 Salt Lake City Police Association
 Utah Chiefs of Police Association
 Major Cities Chiefs Association

References

Further reading
 The Salt Lake City History Project. The History of the Salt Lake City Police Department. (Salt Lake City: The Salt Lake City History Project, 2013)

External links
 Official Website

Police Department
Municipal police departments of Utah
Organizations established in 1849
1849 establishments in the State of Deseret